Shahabi (also Romanized as Shahābī) is a village in Rostaq Rural District, Rostaq District, Darab County, Fars Province, Iran. At the 2006 census, its population was 135, in 35 families.

References 

Populated places in Darab County